Nerve glide, also known as nerve flossing or nerve stretching, is an exercise that stretches nerves. It facilitates the smooth and regular movement of peripheral nerves in the body. It allows the nerve to glide freely along with the movement of the joint and relax the nerve from compression. Nerve gliding cannot proceed with injuries or inflammations as the nerve is trapped by the tissue surrounding the nerve near the joint. Thus, nerve gliding exercise is widely used in rehabilitation programs and during the post-surgical period. In addition to rehabilitating purposes, nerve gliding exercise is also used alongside other treatments to relieve the symptoms and faster recovery.

Radial, median, sciatica, and ulnar nerves require nerve gliding exercise during the rehabilitation period. The most common conditions that require nerve gliding exercise are carpal tunnel syndrome, cubital tunnel syndrome, radial neuropathy, and so on. Therapists prescribe different nerve gliding exercises in order to maximize the effects by correctly diagnosing the symptoms. Patients feel less pain when there is  stretch in nerves, and there should be no aggressive exercise. Without correctly diagnosing symptoms and treatments, it worsens the conditions and nerves. Nerve gliding exercises should be done several times daily, depending on the issue. As patients continuously do nerve gliding exercises, they start to feel less pain after a few weeks.

Research on Therapeutic Effects of Nerve Glide

The Effect of Nerve Glides on Carpal Tunnel Syndrome
Carpal tunnel syndrome (CTS) is a condition that induces pain when the median nerve passes through the carpal tunnel in the wrist. It occurs when median nerves get irritated, compress, and strengthen. CTS evokes symptoms, including pain, paresthesia, and muscle atrophy. This further leads to chronic pain and economic difficulties for patients as it requires work absence and surgical treatment.

Nerve gliding exercise becomes one of the optimal CTS treatments by assisting nerve mobilization. Restoring nerve mobilization would relieve edema and restore adhesion in the carpal tunnel. According to the research, nerve gliding exercise has reduced the pain, decreased sensitive distal latency, and improved the functions that require force to grab. However, inappropriate nerve gliding exercises would worsen the conditions. Neural mobilization via nerve gliding should avoid excessive median nerve stretching when extending fingers in wrist extensions or when otherwise not advised.

Nerve gliding exercise is not an optimal method for every patient. There is limited evidence on the effectiveness of neural gliding. However, the addition of nerve gliding exercise in conservative care accelerates the rehabilitation process and avoids surgical treatment. Further research is required to study the effectiveness of nerve glide physiotherapy and to determine groups that tend to respond better.

The Effect of Nerve Glides on Acute Sciatica and Hip Range of Motion 
Sciatica is low back pain that can extend to the feet. This nerve pain is caused by nerve root irritation or constriction. Sciatica is known as an extremely painful symptom. Nerve glides are a common option for sciatica due to their cost-effectiveness. After performing nerve glides, the Numeric Pain Rating Score (NPRS) rated by patients improved, indicating a reduction in the pain. The nerve glide reduces acute sciatica and improves the range of motion of the hip. When nerve glides were performed along with other therapies, it resulted in a greater reduction in pain. However, the research indicates that there is no statistically significant difference in the results among patients who were treated with nerve glides and other conventional treatments.

The Effect of Nerve Glides on Neck and arm pain 
Neural gliding is used for the rehabilitation of nerve-related neck and arm pain. The pain initiates from the neck, expanding to the arm. Nerve gliding physical therapy is beneficial in reducing pain intensity, bringing short-term improvements. This treatment was found to manage neural tissue through specific postures and movements of the parts in pain. The stretch reduces nerve mechanosensitive that relieves discomforts, eventually leading to the normal function of the body. However, the long-term effects of nerve gliding exercises still remain unclear.

The Effect of Nerve Glides on Cubital Tunnel Syndrome 
Cubital tunnel syndrome is a condition that induces pains when ulnar nerves are stretched, pressed, and irritated. This syndrome is also known as “ulnar nerve entrapment”. Similar to carpal tunnel syndrome, cubital tunnel syndrome evokes symptoms, including pain, numbness, tingling, and weakness in the hand. Patients with cubital tunnel syndrome start to lose the power of their hands, which becomes hard to grip. The irritation occurs near the elbow, where the cubital tunnel is located. The ulnar nerve on the cubital tunnel is susceptible as the cubital tunnel is made up of soft tissue. Therefore, strong pressure leads to numbness.

Ulnar nerve gliding is recommended to reduce symptoms of cubital tunnel syndrome. Patients with ulnar nerve gliding should stay away from the holding position. Rather, patients must repeat nerve gliding with the range of movement. There are various ulnar nerve gliding methods, which include elbow flexion, wrist extension, head tilt, and arm flexion.

Comparison of nerve glide and other treatments

Comparison of nerve gliding exercises with static stretching and dynamic stretching 
Nerve gliding can reduce and strengthen connective tissues resulting in increased hamstring extensibility and passive stiffness. Passive stiffness refers to the resistance elongation that occurs in the joint, tendon, and connective tissue. The acute increase in hamstring extensibility can be seen right after nerve gliding intervention at the maximum range of motion. Nerve glide intervention is found to be slightly more effective than static stretching. The absolute static nerve extensibility was five times greater than the static stretching. While nerve gliding enhances the ability of the hamstring to stretch, the static stretch is more effective in terms of stress relaxation. Unlike static stretching, dynamic stretching shows similar outcomes to nerve gliding exercise. For hamstring flexibility, dynamic stretching targets low extremity muscles, while nerve gliding exercise targets posterior low extremity muscles and neural structures. Although both nerve gliding exercises and dynamic stretching do not lead to huge changes in exercise performance, both stretching methods are essential for pre-exercise stretches to avoid injuries.

Comparison with laser treatment 
An alternative treatment option for carpal tunnel syndrome is low-level laser therapy (LLLT). The research shows that there is a statistically significant improvement in both LLLT and nerve gliding exercises. However, the difference in the effectiveness of LLLT and nerve gliding is not considered to replace nerve gliding physiotherapy. Considering the feasibility of those two treatments in terms of machine availability and cost-effectiveness, nerve gliding exercise remains to be prescribed widely.

Precaution 
The injured or entrapped nerves are sensitive to external stimuli. Thus, nerve gliding, or nerve flossing, must be stopped, or range of motion (ROM) must be reduced once the patient feels the pain. Patients’ pain must be checked to avoid further irritation and injuries. Continuous nerve gliding enhances the movement of the joints and faster rehabilitation. If there is no further progress in rehabilitation, patients must see doctors or therapists for correct diagnosis.  Nerve gliding exercise is not recommended for acute symptoms and severe damage. These cause pulling of nerve roots, which worsens the symptoms and nerve irritations.
When the nerve glide is exercised by injured athletes, it has been shown to have no side effects on their sports performance. The measurements of sports performance include bilateral hamstring flexibility, vertical jump height, shuttle run, and dash sprint. This physiotherapy is safe when performed with caution (not going through the pains). Sports athletes can incorporate nerve glides in warm-up sessions.

References 

Neuroscience
Physical therapy